Poliany or Polyany may refer to:
Polyany, Leningrad Oblast, a settlement in Russia
Polany, Lesser Poland Voivodeship, a village in Poland
Polany, Podkarpackie Voivodeship, a village in Poland
Polany Surowiczne, a former village in Poland
Vyatskiye Polyany, a town in Kirov Oblast, Russia
Polans (eastern), medieval East Slavic tribe, also called Poliany
Polans (western), medieval West Slavic tribe, also called Poliany
Polyany, Primorsky Krai, a settlement in Primorsky Krai, Russia
Polyany, Ryazan Oblast, a village (selo) in Ryazan Oblast, Russia